The Bride Screamed Murder is the 17th album by American rock band the Melvins, released on June 1, 2010. It was their first album to hit the Billboard 200 Pop Charts, at number 200, selling 2,809 albums in the first few weeks. In October 2010, they released a music video with Scion Audio/Visual for the song "Electric Flower", directed by Mark Brooks.

Exclaim! named The Bride Screamed Murder the No. 8 metal album of 2010.

Track listing 
All songs written by the Melvins unless otherwise noted.

Vinyl version
The Bride Screamed Murder's vinyl version was released on Amphetamine Reptile Records in a box featuring different artwork from one of ten different artists, limited to 100 copies each. The artists chosen to provide the artwork were Aesthetic Apparatus, COOP, Molly Osborne (Sold exclusively on tour), Adam Jones, Baseman, Junko Mizuno, Mackie Osborne, HAZE XXL, King Buzzo, and Dalek.

Personnel
 King Buzzo – guitar, vocals
 Dale Crover – drums, vocals
 Coady Willis – drums, vocals
 Mr. Warren – bass, vocals

Additional personnel
 Toshi Kasai – engineer
 John Golden – mastering
 Mackie Osborne – art

References 

2010 albums
Ipecac Recordings albums
Melvins albums